Norman Byrnes may refer to:
Norman Byrnes (botanist) (1922–1998), Australian botanist
Norman Byrnes (lawyer) (1922–2009), American attorney